Wenche Bredrup (15 December 1934 – 25 January 1991) was a Norwegian politician for the Progress Party.

She served as a deputy representative to the Parliament of Norway from Hordaland during the term 1981–1985. In total, she met during 4 days of parliamentary session. She was also a member of Hordaland county council. Outside of politics, she worked with tourism of Western Norway.

References

1934 births
1991 deaths
Politicians from Bergen
Deputy members of the Storting
Progress Party (Norway) politicians
Hordaland politicians
Norwegian women in politics
Women members of the Storting